This is a list of Lord-Lieutenants of the County and City of Bristol.

The position of Lord-Lieutenant of Bristol was created on 1 April 1996, when the county of Avon was abolished. Before then, the city was part of the Avon lieutenancy between 1974 and 1996, and before that it was part of the Gloucestershire lieutenancy, with the exception of a period from 1660 to 1672, when it was part of the Somerset lieutenancy.

Lord-Lieutenants of Bristol to 1974
see Lord Lieutenant of Gloucestershire before the English Restoration
Henry Somerset, Lord Herbert 30 July 1660 – 22 December 1660
James Butler, 1st Duke of Ormonde 22 December 1660 – 22 August 1672
Henry Somerset, 1st Duke of Beaufort 22 August 1672 – 22 March 1689
''see Lord-Lieutenant of Gloucestershire to 1974

Lord-Lieutenants of Bristol from 1996
Sir James Napier Tidmarsh 1 April 1996 – 2007
Mary Prior 17 September 2007 – 2017
Peaches Golding 24 April 2017 to present.

References

External links
 Appointment of Lois Patricia (Peaches) Golding, O.B.E. to be Lord-Lieutenant of and in the County and City of Bristol.

Bristol
Lord-Lieutenants of Bristol
History of Bristol
Lord-Lieutenant